Hélène Frankowska, or Halina Frankowska is a Polish and French mathematician known for her research in control theory and set-valued analysis. She is a director of research at the Centre national de la recherche scientifique, and works in the Institut de Mathématiques de Jussieu of Pierre and Marie Curie University.

Education
Frankowska completed her undergraduate studies in 1979 at the University of Warsaw, in the Department of Mathematics, Informatics and Mechanics. After a year of studies at the International School for Advanced Studies in Trieste, Italy, she completed her doctorate of the third cycle in 1983 and her state doctorate in mathematics in 1984 at Paris Dauphine University.

Contributions and recognition
With Aubin, Frankowska wrote Set-Valued Analysis (Birkhäuser, 1990, reprinted 2009).

She was an invited speaker at the 2010 International Congress of Mathematicians, in the section on control theory and optimization.

References

External links
Home page

Year of birth missing (living people)
Living people
French mathematicians
Polish mathematicians
French women mathematicians
Polish women mathematicians
University of Warsaw alumni
Paris Dauphine University alumni